John Alexander Howe (24 March 1922 – 9 June 2001) was an Australian rules footballer who played with St Kilda in the Victorian Football League (VFL).

Notes

External links 

Jack Howe's playing statistics from The VFA Project

1922 births
Australian rules footballers from Melbourne
St Kilda Football Club players
Brighton Football Club players
2001 deaths
People from South Yarra, Victoria